Brett Waller is an English rugby league footballer who plays for the Newcastle Thunder in Betfred League 1. His position is prop.

He has previously played for Gateshead Thunder, Doncaster, York City Knights, and with amateur club Skirlaugh.  He re-signed to Newcastle Thunder from York in November 2016 having previously played for the Gateshead Thunder until 2012.

References

External links
(archived by web.archive.org) York profile

1987 births
Living people
Doncaster R.L.F.C. players
English rugby league players
Newcastle Thunder players
Rugby league props
York City Knights players